Attalea princeps is a species of palm tree native to the Amazon rainforest of Bolivia.

References

Trees of Bolivia
Trees of Brazil
Trees of Peru
princeps